Yes Magazine or Yes! Magazine may refer to:

 Yes! (U.S magazine), an environmental and political magazine from the United States
 Yes! (Hong Kong magazine), a teen lifestyle magazine from Hong Kong
 Yes! (Philippine magazine), a showbiz-oriented magazine from the Philippines